Borja San Emeterio Díaz (born 16 March 1997) is a Spanish footballer who plays as a right-back for CD Numancia.

Club career

Racing
Born in Sierra de Ibio, Mazcuerras, Cantabria, San Emeterio joined Racing de Santander's youth system in 2007, aged 10. He made his senior debut with the reserves in the 2014–15 season, in Tercera División.

San Emeterio played his first match as a professional on 16 November, starting in a 0–0 away draw against CD Lugo in the Segunda División.

Sevilla
On 16 August 2016, San Emeterio and his brother moved to another reserve team, signing a three-year contract with Sevilla Atlético in the second division. After being rarely used in his first year he featured more regularly in the second, with the latter season ending in relegation.

Lugo
San Emeterio joined Lugo on a three-year deal on 1 August 2018. The following 23 January, he was loaned to Cultural y Deportiva Leonesa of the third tier until June.

On 12 July 2019, San Emeterio moved to CD Atlético Baleares in the same league and also in a temporary deal. Upon returning, he terminated his contract on 7 September 2020.

Numancia
On 7 September 2020, just hours after leaving Lugo, San Emeterio signed a two-year deal with recently relegated side CD Numancia.

Personal life
San Emeterio's twin brother, Federico, is also a footballer. A midfielder, he too was groomed at Racing.

Career statistics

Honours
Spain U19
UEFA European Under-19 Championship: 2015

References

External links
Racing official profile 

1997 births
Living people
People from Torrelavega
Spanish twins
Identical twins
Twin sportspeople
Spanish footballers
Footballers from Cantabria
Association football defenders
Segunda División players
Segunda División B players
Tercera División players
Primera Federación players
Segunda Federación players
Rayo Cantabria players
Racing de Santander players
Sevilla Atlético players
CD Lugo players
Cultural Leonesa footballers
CD Atlético Baleares footballers
CD Numancia players
Spain youth international footballers